The Kingston Mill Historic District is a  historic district in Kingston, New Jersey. It is roughly bounded by Herrontown, River, and Princeton-Kingston Roads in the townships of Princeton in Mercer County, South Brunswick in Middlesex County, and Franklin in Somerset County. It was added to the National Register of Historic Places on April 10, 1986 for its significance in engineering, exploration/settlement, industry, and transportation. The district includes 16 contributing buildings and 2 contributing structures.

History and description
In 1683, Henry Greenland built the first tavern here for travelers between New York City and Philadelphia. The current Kingston Mill, also known as the Kingston Gristmill, was built in 1888, the third one at this site. In 1755, Jacob Skilman built a gristmill and sawmill here on the Millstone River. The mill was burned in 1776 by the British Army during the American Revolutionary War. The district also includes the Greenland–Brinson–Gulick farm, four nearby houses, and the Kingston Bridge, an 18th-century stone arch bridge over the river.  It was one of the first settlements in Princeton, preceded only by the Quaker community along the Stony Brook.

Gallery

See also
National Register of Historic Places listings in Mercer County, New Jersey
National Register of Historic Places listings in Middlesex County, New Jersey
National Register of Historic Places listings in Somerset County, New Jersey

References

External links

Grinding mills in New Jersey
Historic districts in Princeton, New Jersey
National Register of Historic Places in Mercer County, New Jersey
National Register of Historic Places in Middlesex County, New Jersey
National Register of Historic Places in Somerset County, New Jersey
Historic districts on the National Register of Historic Places in New Jersey
New Jersey Register of Historic Places
Grinding mills on the National Register of Historic Places in New Jersey